Agnes Kwaje Lasuba (born 14 August 1948) is a South Sudanese politician.

Early life 
Lasuba was born in Torit, Equatoria. She attended school from 1953 through 1964. Her family went into exile in 1964, causing Lasuba to take a break from schooling. She returned to secondary school in 1965, attending Nabingu Secondary School. She then attended Uganda College of Commerce and Administration, receiving a degree in secretariat and management in 1969.

She married Joseph Oduho, a South Sudanese politician, in May 1970 in a ceremony in Uganda. The pair returned to Sudan in 1972 after the Addis Ababa Agreement.

Lasuba began working as a secretary to the president High Executive Council in 1974. In 1976 she became third secretary of the Regional Assembly and the secretary general of the Women's Union, Southern Region, Juba.

Higher education 
In 1979, she went to the United Kingdom to study public administration and management at Devon, receiving her degree in 1980. She also earned a degrees in sociology from Institute of Social Science in Hague, Holand 1985; a Bachelor of Arts in social studies from the University of East Anglia in 1990; and a Master of Science in gender and policy development also from the University of East Anglia in 1991.

Career 
From 1998 to 2003, Lasuba was active in the Sudan People's Liberation Movement (SPLM) while still living in the United Kingdom. She returned to New Sudan in 2003. Lasuba took part in the peace talks which would eventually lead to the Comprehensive Peace Agreement in 2005. Lasuba then served as a member of parliament. In 2009, she held the title of Minister for Gender, Social welfare and Religious Affairs. As part of President of the Southern Sudan, General Salva Kiir Mayarditwas, restructuring the cabinet in June 2010, she was named the Minister of Gender, Child and Social Welfare in the Cabinet of South Sudan. As Minister, Lasuba focused on gender equality and providing education for young girls. She also argued against girls marrying before the age of 18 or being forced to marry.

See also
 Pricilla Nanyang
 SPLM
 SPLA
 Cabinet of South Sudan

References

1948 births
Living people
Alumni of the University of East Anglia
Government ministers of South Sudan
Members of the National Legislative Assembly (South Sudan)
Sudan People's Liberation Movement politicians
21st-century South Sudanese women politicians
21st-century South Sudanese politicians
Women government ministers of South Sudan